Derek Sinclair Cox (born September 22, 1986) is a former American football cornerback. He was drafted by the Jacksonville Jaguars in the third round of the 2009 NFL Draft. He played college football at William & Mary.

Cox has also played for the San Diego Chargers, Minnesota Vikings, Baltimore Ravens, and the New England Patriots.

High school career
Cox attended Junius H. Rose High School in Greenville, North Carolina. He played with Houston Texans running back Andre Brown.

College career
Cox was a four-year starter for William & Mary. He was a two-time All-Colonial Athletic Association selection and finished his senior season tied for fifth in the CAA with four interceptions and returned a pair of those for touchdowns.

Professional career

2009 NFL Draft
Despite not being invited to the NFL Scouting Combine, Cox was selected by the Jaguars in the third round of the 2009 NFL Draft.

Jacksonville Jaguars

In his first NFL game, Cox intercepted a Peyton Manning pass intended for Reggie Wayne and also recovered a fumble. Cox finished his rookie season with 58 tackles and 4 interceptions.

Cox missed the first two games of the 2012 season due to an injury and returned in Week 3 to face the Indianapolis Colts. Cox finished the 2012 campaign with a career best 60 tackles; he also had 1 FF and 4 interceptions.

San Diego Chargers
On March 13, 2013 Cox agreed to a four-year deal with the San Diego Chargers In week 6, Cox intercepted Andrew Luck to help win the game. Cox was benched three times during the regular season due to inconsistent play. He lost his starting job to veteran Richard Marshall in week 13. Cox finished the season on special teams and managed career-lows, 38 tackles and only 1 interception. He was released on March 4, 2014.

Minnesota Vikings
On March 13, 2014, Cox signed a one-year contract with the Minnesota Vikings.
He was cut after the third preseason game, on August 25, 2014.

Baltimore Ravens
On August 27, 2014, Cox signed a one-year contract with the Baltimore Ravens. He was released three days later. Cox did not play in the 2014 season.

New England Patriots
On June 8, 2015, Cox was signed by the New England Patriots; the team released him on August 1, 2015.

NFL awards and honors
Athlon Sports All-Rookie Team (2009)
Ourlads Scouting All-Rookie Team (2009)
2010 Pro Bowl Alternate

References

External links
Minnesota Vikings bio 
Jacksonville Jaguars bio 

1986 births
Living people
People from Winterville, North Carolina
Players of American football from North Carolina
American football cornerbacks
William & Mary Tribe football players
Jacksonville Jaguars players
San Diego Chargers players
Minnesota Vikings players
Baltimore Ravens players
New England Patriots players